The House of Saud is the royal house of Saudi Arabia.

Saud may also refer to:

People
 Saud (name)

Other uses
 Săud, a villages in Buntești, Hungary

See also 

 Sawad (disambiguation)

Nepali-language surnames